Leonid Georgiyevich Ilyichov (born 30 January 1948) is a retired Russian freestyle swimmer. He competed in five events at the 1968 Summer Olympics and won three team medals; individually, he finished fifth in the 100 m freestyle. He also won six European medals in 1966 and 1970, five in team events, and one individual, a silver in the 100 m freestyle.

References

1948 births
Living people
Russian male freestyle swimmers
Olympic swimmers of the Soviet Union
Swimmers at the 1968 Summer Olympics
Olympic silver medalists for the Soviet Union
Olympic bronze medalists for the Soviet Union
Olympic bronze medalists in swimming
European Aquatics Championships medalists in swimming
Medalists at the 1968 Summer Olympics
Olympic silver medalists in swimming
Universiade medalists in swimming
Universiade bronze medalists for the Soviet Union
Medalists at the 1970 Summer Universiade
Soviet male freestyle swimmers
20th-century Russian people
21st-century Russian people